Jüri Nael (born 9 July 1975) is an Estonian choreographer, pedagogue of dance and physical theatre and actor.

Nael was born and raised in Viljandi. He is 1998 graduate of Viljandi Culture Academy, having majored in choreography.

Between 2001 and 2005, he taught stage movement and dance and was a lecturer at the Estonian Academy of Music and Theatre. From 2006 until 2011, he was a physical theatre associate professor with the academy, and since 2016, professor of supervised physical theatre in postgraduate courses (Master's Program Manager). In 2019, he became the academy's international master's program manager of modern performing arts. Between 2006 and 2007, he was a lecturer at Tallinn University's Department of Choreography, and head of department from 2007 until 2008, and associate professor from 2007 until 2011. He has also been a visiting Professor of Choreography  at Jacksonville University in Florida, US. Since 2011, he is a lecturer of physical theatre at the Royal Academy of Dramatic Art in London. Since 2019 he is studying at Estonian Music and Theatre Academy (doctoral studies).

From 2006 until 2011, he was one of the judges in the Kanal 2 television dance competition series Tantsud tähtedega. He has also appeared as an actor in the television series Riigimehed and Väikesed hiiglased.

Nael is gay and speaks openly about his sexuality in hopes to foster further acceptance of the LGBT community in Estonia.

Works
 2006: Margoshes' ja Fernandez' "Fame" (director, musical theatre, in Tallinn Linnahall)
 2010: "Naela Waiting for ..." (director, with L. Marshall, solo performance)

References

Living people
1975 births
Estonian choreographers
Estonian male dancers
Estonian educators
Estonian television personalities
Estonian male television actors
Estonian Academy of Music and Theatre alumni
Academic staff of the Estonian Academy of Music and Theatre
Alumni of the University of Warwick
University of Amsterdam alumni
Academic staff of Tallinn University
Estonian LGBT people
People from Viljandi